Missen Flat is a rural locality in the Toowoomba Region, Queensland, Australia.

Road infrastructure
The New England Highway passes through from north to south. The Gatton–Clifton Road (State Route 80) runs along the south-east boundary.

References 

Toowoomba Region
Localities in Queensland